Jogesh Chandra Chaudhuri College, established in 1965, is an undergraduate college in Kolkata, West Bengal, India. It is affiliated with the University of Calcutta.

Departments

Science

Chemistry
Physics
Mathematics
Computer Science
Botany
Zoology
Geography
Electronics
Economics

Arts and Commerce

Bengali
Education
English
Hindi
History
Political Science
Philosophy
Journalism 
Sociology
Commerce

Accreditation
The college is recognized by the University Grants Commission (UGC). It was RE-accredited by the National Assessment and Accreditation Council (NAAC), and awarded B++ grade (2016).

See also 
Jogesh Chandra Chaudhuri Law College
List of colleges affiliated to the University of Calcutta
Education in West Bengal

References

External links
Jogesh Chandra Chaudhuri College

Educational institutions established in 1964
University of Calcutta affiliates
Universities and colleges in Kolkata
1965 establishments in West Bengal